Acentrella hyaloptera is a species of small minnow mayfly in the family Baetidae.

References

Mayflies
Insects described in 1951